Three Upbuilding Discourses (1844) is a book by Søren Kierkegaard.

History
Kierkegaard published his Eighteen Upbuilding Discourses throughout the years 1843 and 1844. He followed the Socratic Method by publishing his own view of life under his own name and different views of life under pseudonyms. His own view was that of "a committed Christian trained for the ministry."

He published three books on the same day in 1843 and now, in 1844, he will publish four books in the month of June: Three Upbuilding Discourses, June 8, Philosophical Fragments, June 13, Prefaces, and The Concept of Anxiety, June 17. He had a plan in mind as he published these works.

Kierkegaard says, "all who are expecting do have one thing in common, that they are expecting something in the future, because expectancy and the future are inseparable ideas." But many people live in "conflict with the future" Yet, "by the eternal, one can conquer the future, because the eternal is the ground of the future, and therefore through it the future can be fathomed. What, then, is the eternal power in a human being? It is faith. What is the expectancy of faith? Victory-or, as Scripture so earnestly and so movingly teaches us, that all things must serve for good those who love God." Kierkegaard writes about expectancy once more in these discourses. Expectancy has to do with hope. "The healthy individual lives simultaneously in hope and in recollection, and only thereby does his life gain true and substantive continuity. Thus he has hope and therefore does not wish to go backward in time, as do those who live only in recollection. What, then, does recollection do for him, for it certainly must have some influence? It places a sharp on the note of the moment; the further back it goes, the more often the repetition, the more sharps there are. For example, if in the present year he experiences an erotic moment, this is augmented by his recollection of it in the previous year etc. … Hope hovers over it as a hope of eternity that fills out the moment.

Kierkegaard writes about remembering one's Creator, hoping, being concerned about one's eternal salvation, and knowing one's place in the world in these discourses.

Structure 
His three discourses are dedicated "To the late Michael Pedersen Kierkegaard formerly a clothing merchant here in the city My Father". All but one of his Eighteen Upbuilding Discourses were dedicated to his father. He also includes a dedication: "to that single individual whom I with joy and gratitude call my reader". Regine Olsen is "my reader" according to some scholars. Here is his dedication for these discourses. 

His discourses;
 Think about Your Creator in the Days of Your Youth
 The Expectancy of an Eternal Salvation
 He Must Increase; I Must Decrease

Think about Your Creator in the Days of Your Youth
Based on the following text; "REMEMBER ALSO your Creator in the days of your youth, before the evil days come, and the years draw nigh, when you will say, "I have no pleasure in them"" Ecclesiastes 12:1  RSV, The Bible

This discourse begins with the question of truth. He identifies two kinds of truth, one which is indifferent to the single individual because it pertains to all human beings equally. He says, "There is a truth, the greatness and the grandeur of which we are accustomed to praise by saying admiringly that it is indifferent, equally valid, whether anyone accepts it or not; indifferent to the individual's particular condition, whether he is young or old, happy or dejected; indifferent to its relation to him, whether it benefits him or harms him, whether it keeps him from something or assists him to it; equally valid whether he totally subscribes to it or coldly and impassively professes it, whether he gives his life for it or uses it for ill gain; indifferent to whether he has found it himself or merely repeats what has been taught."

Then he writes of another kind of truth. There is another kind of truth or, if this is humbler, another kind of truths that could be called concerned truths. They do not live on a lofty plane, for the simple reason that, ashamed, as it were, they are conscious of not applying universally to all occasions but only specifically to particular occasions. They are not indifferent to the single individual's particular condition, whether he is young or old, happy or dejected, because this determines for them whether they are to be truths for him. Neither do they promptly let go of the individual and forsake him, but they continue to be concerned about him until he himself completely breaks away, and even to this they are not indifferent, although he is not able to make these truths doubtful about themselves. Such a truth is not indifferent to how the individual received it, whether he wholeheartedly appropriates it or it becomes mere words to him. This very difference certainly shows that it is jealous of itself, is not indifferent to whether the truth becomes a blessing or a ruination to him, since this contrary decision witnesses specifically against the equal validity; it is not indifferent to whether he honestly places his confidence in it or whether, himself deceived, he wants to deceive others, since this avenging wrath expressly shows that it is not indifferent. Such a concerned truth is not independent of the one who has propounded it; on the contrary, he remains present in it continually in order in turn to concern himself about the single individual. Eighteen Upbuilding Discourses, p. 233-234

Kierkegaard says the text from Ecclesiastes should "awaken you to concern about yourself." "The thought of the Creator is youth's most beautiful splendor" and the Preacher "is not just saying that you can think about your Creator, but he admonishes you to do it; and if you are young, whether you are joyful or dejected; whether you are carefree or discouraged, whoever you are, it is nevertheless to you, precisely to you, that he is speaking, you to whom the admonition applies ...

The existence of God has been debated throughout time. Both Hegel and Schelling attended the University of Tübingen, the school was interested in using higher criticism of Biblical texts to determine the truth of the claims of Christianity. Hegel wrote the following in 1832, 

He says religion has always stopped the philosophers and scientists from gaining knowledge because the Christian religion is opposed to any knowledge that differs from Biblical knowledge. Hedgel is indifferent to what the Bible says. He writes in his Philosophy of Religion If at the present day philosophy be an object of enmity because it occupies itself with religion, this cannot really surprise us when we consider the general character of the time. Every one who attempts to take to do with the knowledge of God, and by the aid of thought to comprehend His nature, must be prepared to find, that either no attention will be paid to him, or that people will turn against him and combine to oppose him. The more the knowledge of finite things has increased and the increase is so great that the extension of the sciences has become almost boundless, and all regions of knowledge are enlarged to an extent which makes a comprehensive view impossible so much the more has the sphere of the knowledge of God become contracted.
There was a time when all knowledge was knowledge of God. Our own time, on the contrary, has the distinction of knowing about all and everything, about an infinite number of subjects, but nothing at all of God. Formerly the mind found its supreme interest in knowing God, and searching into His nature. It had and it found no rest unless in thus occupying itself with God. When it could not satisfy this need it felt unhappy. The spiritual conflicts to which the knowledge of God gives rise in the inner life were the highest which the spirit knew and experienced in itself, and all other interests and knowledge were lightly esteemed. Our own time has put this need, with all its toils and conflicts, to silence; we have done with all this, and got rid of it. What Tacitus said of the ancient Germans, that they were securi adversus deos, we have once more become in regard to knowledge, securi adversus deum. It no longer gives our age any concern that it knows nothing of God; on the contrary, it is regarded as a mark of the highest intelligence to hold that such knowledge is not even possible. What is laid down by the Christian religion as the supreme, absolute commandment, "Ye shall know God," is regarded as a piece of folly. Christ says, "Be ye perfect, as My Father in heaven is perfect." This lofty demand is to the wisdom of our time an empty sound. It has made of God an infinite phantom, which is far from us, and in like manner has made human knowledge a futile phantom of finiteness, or a mirror upon which fall only shadows, only phenomena. How, then, are we any longer to respect the commandment, and grasp its meaning, when it says to us, " Be ye perfect, as your Father in heaven is perfect," since we know nothing of the Perfect One, and since our knowing and willing are confined solely and entirely to appearance, and the truth is to be and to remain absolutely and exclusively a something beyond the present? And what, we must further ask, what else would it be worth while to comprehend, if God is incomprehensible? P. 35-36

Kierkegaard addressed this idea of proving God in this discourse. He says, "When one grows older, everything becomes so miserable. God in heaven has to sit and wait for the decision on his fate, whether he exists, and finally he comes into existence with the help of a few demonstrations; human beings have to put up with waiting for the matter to be decided. Suppose that a person died before that time; suppose that when the matter was finally decided he was not in the practice of thinking about God as a Creator and the joy over that was all gone!" He also said, "Even though the Preacher ordinarily speaks rigorously to people, he nevertheless is so courteous as to assume that you understand that there is a God is not so vain as to think that he has invented the existence of God. He had already made his decision about Christianity as early as 1835 when he wrote:it is not possible to harvest immediately what one has sown. I will remember that philosopher's method of having his disciples keep silent for three years; then I dare say it will come. Just as one does not begin a feast at sunrise but at sundown, just so in the spiritual world one must work forward for some time before the sun really shines for us and rises in all its glory; for although it is true as it says that God lets his sun shine upon the good and the evil and lets the rain fall on the just and the unjust, it is not so in the spiritual world. So let the die be cast — I am crossing the Rubicon! No doubt this road takes me into battle, but I will not renounce it. I will not lament the past — why lament? I will work energetically and not waste time in regrets, like the person stuck in a bog and first calculating how far he has sunk without recognizing that during the time he spends on that he is sinking still deeper. I will hurry along the path I have found and shout to everyone I meet: Do not look back as Lot's wife did, but remember that we are struggling up a hill.
Journals of Kierkegaard, IA August 1, 1835

This idea of separating the Creator and youth's thought about the Creator is harmful. He says, "with the years came understanding, and with understanding knowledge, and with knowledge grief,-and with increased knowledge increased grief. But as he was developed and educated in this way, the simple became more difficult for him, and since without this guidance he wanted to rule himself, everything became more and more complicated. – Perhaps he chose the guidance of thought, and in order not to owe anyone anything he let this seed sow itself and let one thought evolve out of another, until eventually the infinite manifested itself to him and made him dizzy. The more he stared fixedly at it, the more his eye lost the visual power to find the way back to finitude.-Perhaps desire blinded him, life seemed like a joke to him, and he let God grieve in heaven while he chose pleasure and let enthusiasm speak in vain about conflict and struggle, about courage in dangers, patience in tribulation, love in life, victory in death, reward in heaven, while he let every day have its pleasure.-Perhaps a worldly-minded worry about food and clothing scattered his mind so that he did neither the one nor the other." Kierkegaard's remedy for this individual is to find a place to be alone with God. He says, "Just as the first book in the Old Testament has been called Genesis, the second Exodus, so it could very well be said that in human life there is a third book called Retreat." He continues, "We are speaking only of the beautiful meaning of the retreat for human life and of how having thought about the Creator in one's youth is the retreat's rescuing angel. Let a person's work take from him what belongs to it, his time, his diligence, but in the advancing years, O God, preserve a recollection of youth that preserves youth's thought of the Creator. Woe to him who separates what God has joined together, who to him who separates adulthood from its youth.

The Expectancy of an Eternal Salvation
based on this text; "For this slight momentary affliction is preparing for us an eternal weight of glory beyond all comparison, because we look not to the things that are seen but to the things that are unseen; for the things that are seen are transient, but the things that are unseen are eternal." 2 Corinthians 4.17-18

Kierkegaard moves the reader from the idea of the Creator to that of an eternal salvation. Is there such a thing as an eternal salvation? He says. It may be a merit of our present age that in many ways it has known how to work the wish weary and in that way to wean the soul from wishing; it may be to its advantage if it thereby has developed an honest earnestness that for the good renounces the fraudulence of wishes. We do not reproach the age for having made the idea of the power of the wish into playing with words if it thereby motivates someone to work with his own hands instead of with the borrowed energy of the wish. But the wish for heaven's salvation-is this, too, a play on words, as wishing for heavenly help has become for the frivolous, who thinks that we ought to depend on God the way we depend on people –that is, if you help yourself then God does the rest. And if the wish for heaven's salvation has become playing with words, has the aim in it been to incite people to work all the harder to gain it? This seems not at all to be the case. Instead, eternal salvation seems to have become what the thought of it has become, a loose and idle phrase, at times virtually forgotten, or arbitrarily left out of the language, or indifferently set aside as an old-fashioned turn of speech no longer used but retained only because it is so quaint. And whereas in the old days one received heaven's salvation by the grace of God, nowadays heaven's salvation often seems to have become like an old, decrepit person who in the house of the mighty sustains his life on the miserable bread of charity. Eighteen Upbuilding Discourses, p. 254

Kierkegaard asks, where does the single individual turn if he wants to think about the expectancy of an eternal life? How does it work in civic affairs? Does a state official turn to "aliens and foreigners" or to "loafers and irresponsible tramps" or "robbers and agitators" to discuss the state of the nation? No, the official goes to someone who has a "concern" for the "welfare of the country." The single individual doesn't go to someone who says "salvation is a matter or course" he goes to someone who  knows "that no one can serve two masters, since he must hate the one and love the other" (Matthew 6:24), whose soul is fully awakened from sleep to understand what presumably would hurl the sleepwalker into the abyss, "that love of the world is hatred of God!" (James 4.4) Kierkegaard puts it this way, 

How can we find out of the single individual is ready for eternal salvation? Kierkegaard says, "Any army sometimes has a select little group called the immortal battalion, and a warrior esteems it a great honor to be accepted into it. Let us suppose that there was a man who was just as concerned about being in that battalion as everyone ought to be concerned about being an heir of heaven's salvation. The conditions were sufficiently known; distinction in battle was required, but also a certain appearance, a specific height, physique, etc. He would then examine himself to see whether he filled all the requirements, not in general, not casually, because he would be too concerned for that, and he knew that if he was deficient in merely the slightest way he would not be accepted. And whether anything was lacking or everything was present in the right proportion the commander would decide in his appraisal. Can we talk about the Christian in the same way? No. Kierkegaard says, "every person has heaven's salvation, only by the grace and mercy of God, and this is equally close to every human being in the sense that it is a matter between God and him; and let no third person, himself having been restored to grace, forfeit this by unwarranted interference.  If there was a person who embittered my life early and late and thought nothing but the worst of me, would his also being saved be able to disturb my salvation?

Eternal salvation is equally close to everyone. There is no distinction between the simple and the wise. He says, "If one was not what in a more elevated way is called a simple man, but what in plain, everyday speech is called a real simpleton, and you, my listener, were a wise person who profoundly asked, "What is truth?" and restlessly pondered the question with competence and success-do you suppose it would disturb you if he became just as blessed as you and heaven's infinite salvation made you both equal?" 

Kierkegaard questions whether having arrived at a truth is better than the continual striving after truth. First a quotation from this discourse and then two similar quotations from Concluding Unscientific Postscript and then one from Practice in Christianity.

He Must Increase; I Must Decrease
the text; "He who has the bride is the bridegroom; the friend of the bridegroom, who stands and hears him, rejoices greatly at the bridegroom's voice; therefore this joy of mine is now full. He must increase, but I must decrease." Gospel of John 3.29-30

Kierkegaard talks about the same things he's been talking about in all his writings, self-knowledge. He says, "Everyone else would presumably understand that self-knowledge is a difficult matter; although it is easy to understand the rest of the world, the understanding suddenly changes very substantially when it pertains to oneself." He speaks of choosing oneself in Either/Or, "When a person considers himself esthetically his soul is like soil out of which grow all sorts of herbs, all with equal claim to flourish; his self consists of this multiplicity, and he has no self that is higher than this (...) Someone who views the personality ethically has at once an absolute difference: namely, the difference between good and evil. And if he finds more of evil in him than of good, this still does not mean that it is the evil that is to advance, but it means that it is the evil that is to recede and the good that is to advance. (...) It truly takes considerable ethical courage to acknowledge the good as the highest, because one thereby falls into altogether universal categories."

He uses another single individual, John the Baptist to talk about "the rising and setting of the sun." He says, "all deeper and more inward self-knowledge sees the finger of God that points to him." John was "the voice crying in the wilderness", then the "morning star" came and his disciples were sad because people were going to him and John said, "He must increase; I must decrease." John was willing to step aside because "he knew that the ceremony after which he was named would be abolished, would disappear as a baptism with water in contrast to a baptism with fire and the Holy Spirit."When a common danger stands at everyone's door, when a common calamity teaches people to hold together and drums reconciliation into them, then it certainly is seen how they are reconciled in the understanding of the same things and how this reconciliation would benefit them jointly and would benefit the individual. But when the danger is over and the calamity has had its day, then there is all too quickly a relapse into the old ways of life, and the reconciliation coerced by the need sometimes carries within itself the seed of a deeper separation than the one that was eliminated. And even if that reconciliation casts an enhancing radiance over the period of the individual's lives, it nevertheless belongs essentially not to them but to the observation and the observer who inherits it, until the story about it is also forgotten. Even though it is beautiful to envision this, such a life is a life of temporality, is the fruit of temporality, but also the prey of temporality, and the most that can be said of it is that it was a beautiful moment. But compared with eternity, this beautiful moment of temporality is nothing but the silver flash of imitation metal. When a common danger stands at everyone's door, when a common calamity teaches people to hold together and drums reconciliation into them, then it certainly is seen how they are reconciled in the understanding of the same things and how this reconciliation would benefit them jointly and would benefit the individual. But when the danger is over and the calamity has had its day, then there is all too quickly a relapse into the old ways of life, and the reconciliation coerced by the need sometimes carries within itself the seed of a deeper separation than the one that was eliminated. And even if that reconciliation casts an enhancing radiance over the period of the individual's lives, it nevertheless belongs essentially not to them but to the observation and the observer who inherits it, until the story about it is also forgotten. Even though it is beautiful to envision this, such a life is a life of temporality, is the fruit of temporality, but also the prey of temporality, and the most that can be said of it is that it was a beautiful moment. But compared with eternity, this beautiful moment of temporality is nothing but the silver flash of imitation metal.Eighteen Upbuilding Discourses, p. 233-234  "John remained true to himself.

Kierkegaard says to his readers, 

John's "joy became more for him the more he was diminished. … This was John, and this is how the single individual is to fulfill something similar in lesser situations. If he has first of all learned to deny himself humbly and to master his mind, then joy will also be victorious. But the first must be learned first-later, that which is greater; one is first initiated into the lesser mystery, later into the mystery." Kiedrkegaard says, what about the single individual who wants to be like John? Do we all know how to deny ourseves with humility? He says, Who does not know that things like these have happened and do happen in the world-that someone who once ruled over countries and kingdoms has ceased to rule and is obliged to see a more powerful ruler take his place; that someone who once was hailed with jubilation soon, yes, so soon that the whole things seems to have been a dream, hears the same jubilation shouting another name, that someone whose commanding figure was familiar to everyone regards himself in the next moment with the anxiety of uncertainty about whether he has lost his mind or the world its memory so that it confused with him someone else; that the master whole pupil only yesterday sat at his feet must bow his shoulders today under the other's advancement; that the businessman who was kind enough to set his servant on his path now sees that his path means the benefactor's downfall; that the girl who once filled her beloved's thoughts now sits and sees his bold ambition pursuing a higher goal; that the singer whose words were on everyone's lips is forgotten today and his songs have been more than replaced; that the orator whose words echoed everywhere must now seek the solitude of the desert if he wants echo; that the friend from youth who was on an equal basis with his fellows now with amazement perceives the distance; that the lowly cottage where the parents lived, where the humble cradle stood, is now collapsing like a recollection that cannot catch up with the mighty. And yet, how strange-if you let your thoughts dwell on those distinguished people whose memory the generations have preserved, you will find that the way each individual distinguished himself is different, and you will find in turn that several are distinguished by the same thing. But in that select group you still seem to lack one place, and yet the lack is indeed a contradiction; how would the one whose task it was to be reconciled-to being forgotten-find a place in recollection? But for this very reason it is important to consider it by itself, and it is especially beautiful to do this-because no earthly reward is beckoning. Eighteen Upbuilding Discourses, Hong, p. 278-279

He begins with the rising and setting sun and ends on the same note. His message to the single individual is: "Every human being is only an instrument and does not know when the moment will come when he will be put aside. If he himself does not at times evoke this thought, he is a hireling, an unfaithful servant, who is trying to free himself and to cheat the Lord of the uncertainty in which he comprehends his own nothingness. That much in life is empty and worthless, people certainly do know, but how frequently the single individual makes an exception, and even the highest mission in the spiritual world is only an errand, and one who is equipped for it with all spiritual-intellectual gifts is only on an errand..." He says, "John was the bridegroom's friend, who stands and hears his voice and rejoices greatly; but the least one in the kingdom of heaven is greater than John, because he does not stand outside listening to the bridegroom's voice."

Criticism

The Encyclopædia Britannica had an article about Kierkegaard in their 1910 issue. "Kierkegaard, Søren Aaby (1813–1855) Danish philosopher, the seventh child of a Jutland hosier, was born in Copenhagen on the 5th of May 1813. As a boy he was delicate precocious and morbid in temperament. He studied theology at the university of Copenhagen, where he graduated in 1840 with a treatise On Irony. For two years he travelled in Germany, and in 1842 settled finally in Copenhagen, where he died on the 11th of November 1855. He had lived in studious retirement, subject to physical suffering and depression. His first volume, Papers of a Still Living Man (1838), a characterization of Hans Andersen, was a failure, and he was for some time unnoticed. In 1843 he published Euten-Eller (Either-or) (4th edition 1878), a work on which his reputation mainly rests; it is a discussion of the ethical and aesthetic ideas of life. In his last years he carried on a feverish agitation against the theology and practice of the state church, on the ground that religion is for the individual soul, and is to be separated absolutely from the state and the world. In general his philosophy was a reaction against the speculative thinkers-Steffens (q.v.), Niels Treschow (1751–1833) and Frederik Christian Sibbern (1785–1872); it was based on the absolute dualism of Faith and Knowledge. His chief follower was Rasmus Neilsen (1809–1884) and he was opposed by Georg Brandes, who wrote a brilliant account of his life and works. As a dialectician he has been described as little inferior to Plato, and his influence on the literature of Denmark is considerable both in style and in matter. To him Ibsen owed his character Brand in the drama of that name."

"[Treschow's] favourite subject is a question, which is very well understood abroad, but not much considered here, Anthropology. His Elements of the Philosophy of History is a purely Anthropological Work. He calls himself Physical rather than Material. He disclaims the notions of Lamarck. Man has not been developed out of a Monad, but he has been developed out of some condition inferior to his present one. There was once a time when he could neither speak plainly, nor walk uprightly, just as certainly as there was once a time when he could neither read nor write. The primaeval state of man lay within certain limitations. It was never indefinitely low in the scale of Creation; inasmuch as Nature produces parallel types subject to parallel developments. Man grew out an Aquatic, or (I speak as a Quinarian) a Natatorial type. In the inferior stages of his organization he was, not a Monkey, but a Walrus. The history of the individual is the history of the species. The human kind in general, like the human being in particular, has its ages of childhood, youth, manhood, &c. &c. with their characteristic virtues and vices. The uterus is to the embryo as the tohu wabohu was to the world. Our nature proceeds gradually towards perfection."

"Hegelianism promised to make absolute knowledge available by virtue of a science of logic. Anyone with the capacity to follow the dialectical progression of the purportedly transparent concepts of Hegel's logic would have access to the mind of God (which for Hegel was equivalent to the logical structure of the universe). Kierkegaard thought this to be the hubristic attempt to build a new tower of Babel, or a scala paradisi — a dialectical ladder by which humans can climb with ease up to heaven. Kierkegaard's strategy was to invert this dialectic by seeking to make everything more difficult. Instead of seeing scientific knowledge as the means of human redemption, he regarded it as the greatest obstacle to redemption. Instead of seeking to give people more knowledge he sought to take away what passed for knowledge. Instead of seeking to make God and Christian faith perfectly intelligible he sought to emphasize the absolute transcendence by God of all human categories. Instead of setting himself up as a religious authority, Kierkegaard used a vast array of textual devices to undermine his authority as an author and to place responsibility for the existential significance to be derived from his texts squarely on the reader." Sanford Encyclopedia of Philosophy, Søren Kierkegaard, First published Tue December 3, 1996; substantive revision Fri May 8, 2009

Kierkegaard had two visions, one in which everyone would hold together in temporality. He says, When a common danger stands at everyone's door, when a common calamity teaches people to hold together and drums reconciliation into them, then it certainly is seen how they are reconciled in the understanding of the same things and how this reconciliation would benefit them jointly and would benefit the individual. But when the danger is over and the calamity has had its day, then there is all too quickly a relapse into the old ways of life, and the reconciliation coerced by the need sometimes carries within itself the seed of a deeper separation than the one that was eliminated. And even if that reconciliation casts an enhancing radiance over the period of the individual's lives, it nevertheless belongs essentially not to them but to the observation and the observer who inherits it, until the story about it is also forgotten. Even though it is beautiful to envision this, such a life is a life of temporality, is the fruit of temporality, but also the prey of temporality, and the most that can be said of it is that it was a beautiful moment. But compared with eternity, this beautiful moment of temporality is nothing but the silver flash of imitation metal. Eighteen Upbuilding Discourses, p. 265-266  The existentialist, Albert Camus follows this line of thought with his book The Plague. He says finite concerns hold people together. He noted that a plague or other disaster would bring people together in a common concern. Camus and other writers, like Martin Heidegger believe common outer experiences hold people and nations together. Kierkegaard believes the inner expectations of Christians hold them together.  Kierkegaard began his study of the inner and the outer with his first book, Either/Or.

Kierkegaard says, "When life's demands exceed experience's understanding, then life is disordered and inconsolable, unless the expectancy of an eternal salvation orders and calms. (...) The expectancy of an eternal salvation will reconcile everyone with his neighbor, with his friend, and with his enemy in an understanding of the essential." Kierkegaard believed in just one commandment, Love thy neighbor as thyself.

Notes

References

Sources

Primary sources
Remember Now Thy Creator In the Days of Thy Youth Swenson translation
The Expectation of an Eternal Happiness Swenson translation
 Eighteen Upbuilding Discourses, by Søren Kierkegaard, Princeton University Press. Hong, 1990
 Either/Or Part I, Edited by Victor Eremita, February 20, 1843, translated by David F. Swenson and Lillian Marvin Swenson Princeton University Press 1971
 Either/Or Part 2, Edited by Victor Eremita, February 20, 1843, Hong 1987
 Fear and Trembling; Copyright 1843 Søren Kierkegaard – Kierkegaard's Writings; 6 – copyright 1983 – Howard V. Hong
 Concluding Unscientific Postscript to Philosophical Fragments Volume I, by Johannes Climacus, edited by Søren Kierkegaard, Copyright 1846 – Edited and Translated by Howard V. Hong and Edna H. Hong 1992 Princeton University Press
 The Point of View for My Work as An Author: A Report to History, edited by Benjamin Neilson, by Søren Kierkegaard 1848,  Translated with Introductory Notes by Walter Lowrie, 1962, Harper and Row Publishers
Lectures on the philosophy of religion, together with a work on the proofs of the existence of God, by Wilhelm Friedrich Hegel, 1832, Translated from the 2d German ed. by E.B. Speirs, and J. Burdon Sanderson: the translation edited by E.B. Speirs. Published 1895 by K. Paul, Trench, Trubner in London
Norway and the Norwegians, Volume 2  By Robert Gordon Latha CHAPTER XII and XIII. covers Holberg, Heiberg, Wessel and Steffens Chapter XIII Treschow —His writings — Anthropology — Eilschow., 1840, p.142-158

Secondary sources
Stanford Encyclopedia of Philosophy - Søren Kierkegaard
Stanford Encyclopedia of Philosophy - Existentialism
Historical Dictionary of Kierkegaard's Philosophy, By Julie Watkin, Scarecrow Press, 2001

External links
 

Books by Søren Kierkegaard
1844 books